Jonathan Robert "Jonny" Adam (born 4 September 1984 in Lochgelly, Fife) is a British racing driver and a factory driver for Aston Martin Racing. He was the champion of the SEAT Cupra Championship in two of its six seasons – winning in 2007 and in 2008. He also won the 2005 Elf Renault Clio Cup. He competed in the British Touring Car Championship in 2009 and currently competes in the FIA World Endurance Championship, British GT Championship, winning the 2015, 2016, 2018 and 2019 championships. He also won the LMGTE Pro class at the 2017 24 Hours of Le Mans.

Career history

Early career
Adam began his career in karting, winning the 1999 Scottish Kart TKM challenge, and he finished 5th overall in the British Kart Championship (100 National) in 2002, and also went on to win the "Summerlee" championship at Larkhall.

In 2003, Jonathan finished 3rd overall in the Scottish Formula Ford Zetec Championship, however he was 2nd and 5pts behind Ryan Cannon in the Newcomer's Cup.

Clio Cup
Adam moved into the Renault Clio Cup in 2004, and after a season long battle with Ed Pead and Paul Rivett, it was the latter who took the title after Adam failed to finish in the penultimate race at Donington Park. Jonathan eventually finished 3rd in the championship.

Adam then took 4 podiums, including a win, to become the Clio Cup Winter series champion.

2005 saw him resume his battle with Pead in the Clios, which took the championship down to the final meeting of the year at Donington Park, where Adam clinched it with a race to spare.

SEAT Cupra Championship

Jonathan competed in another one-makes series in 2006, this time the SEAT Cupra Championship. He finished 3rd, in a competitive series with would-be 2007 BTCC driver Mat Jackson and Alan Blencowe finishing ahead of him in the standings.

In 2007, Adam continued in the championship, driving in the top Leon Cupra R class, and sealed the title with 3 races to go at his home circuit of Knockhill, taking 9 wins and 17 podium from the 20 races. He remains in the SEAT Cupra Championship for 2008. At Knockhill he took a double hat-trick – 2 poles, 2 victories, 2 fastest laps, although he remained 14 points behind championship leader Robert Lawson. He eventually won the championship for the second year in succession.

British Touring Car Championship

Adam joined the British Touring Car Championship in 2009, driving a BMW 320si for Motorbase Performance.
At the first round of the season at Brands Hatch he was first past the chequered flag in the third race of the day, only to be penalised for hitting Jason Plato when he passed the 2001 champion for the lead.

British GT Championship

Unable to find funding to continue in the BTCC, Adam moved to the British GT Championship to drive an Aston Martin DBRS9 for Beechdean Motorsport for 2011. Adam and co-driver Andrew Howard took their maiden win that season at Rockingham in wet conditions. They took pole position at the final race of the season at Silverstone and went on to take the win, allowing to finish the season 3rd in the GT3 standings.

Adam once again teamed up with Howard for 2012, driving Beechdean's Aston Martin V12 Vantage GT3. They took the first win for the new car in the third race of the season at the Nürburgring.

From 2015 and onwards, Adam has finished in the top 3 in the GT3 Championship standings in the British GT Championship, winning the title in 2015, 2016, 2018, and 2019.

24 Hours of Le Mans

After a 6th-place finish at the 2016 race, Adam won the LMGTE Pro class at the 2017 24 Hours of Le Mans in the No. 97 Aston Martin Vantage GTE alongside Darren Turner and Daniel Serra. He overtook the stricken No. 63 Corvette of Jordan Taylor, Antonio García, and Jan Magnussen in the final two laps of the race to take the win.

Jonathan Adam Became a two time class winner at Le Mans in 2020, but this time in the GTE Am class with TF Sport.

Racing record

Complete British Touring Car Championship results
(key) (Races in bold indicate pole position – 1 point awarded just in first race) (Races in italics indicate fastest lap – 1 point awarded all races) (* signifies that driver lead race for at least one lap – 1 point awarded all races)

Complete British GT Championship results
(key) (Races in bold indicate pole position) (Races in italics indicate fastest lap)

† Driver did not finish, but was classified as he completed 90% race distance.
‡ As Adam was a guest driver, he was ineligible to score points.

Complete GT World Challenge Europe Sprint Cup results

Complete FIA World Endurance Championship results
(key) (Races in bold indicate pole position; races in
italics indicate fastest lap)

Complete European Le Mans Series results

Complete 24 Hours of Le Mans results

Complete IMSA SportsCar Championship results
(key) (Races in bold indicate pole position)

References

External links
 
 

1984 births
Living people
Sportspeople from Kirkcaldy
Scottish racing drivers
Formula Ford drivers
British Formula Renault 2.0 drivers
British Touring Car Championship drivers
British GT Championship drivers
Blancpain Endurance Series drivers
FIA World Endurance Championship drivers
24 Hours of Daytona drivers
24 Hours of Le Mans drivers
24 Hours of Spa drivers
European Le Mans Series drivers
WeatherTech SportsCar Championship drivers
Britcar 24-hour drivers
Renault UK Clio Cup drivers
Aston Martin Racing drivers
Action Express Racing drivers
Nürburgring 24 Hours drivers
Asian Le Mans Series drivers
24H Series drivers